{{DISPLAYTITLE:Uniform 2 k1 polytope}}

In geometry, 2k1 polytope is a uniform polytope in n dimensions (n = k+4) constructed from the En Coxeter group. The family was named by their Coxeter symbol as 2k1 by its bifurcating Coxeter-Dynkin diagram, with a single ring on the end of the 2-node sequence. It can be named by an extended Schläfli symbol {3,3,3k,1}.

Family members 
The family starts uniquely as 6-polytopes, but can be extended backwards to include the 5-orthoplex (pentacross) in 5-dimensions, and the 4-simplex (5-cell) in 4-dimensions.

Each polytope is constructed from (n-1)-simplex and 2k-1,1 (n-1)-polytope facets, each has a vertex figure as an (n-1)-demicube, {31,n-2,1}.

The sequence ends with k=6 (n=10), as an infinite hyperbolic tessellation of 9-space.

The complete family of 2k1 polytope polytopes are:
 5-cell: 201, (5 tetrahedra cells)
 Pentacross: 211, (32 5-cell (201) facets)
 221, (72 5-simplex and 27 5-orthoplex (211) facets)
 231, (576 6-simplex and 56 221 facets)
 241, (17280 7-simplex and 240 231 facets)
 251, tessellates Euclidean 8-space (∞ 8-simplex and ∞ 241 facets)
 261, tessellates hyperbolic 9-space (∞ 9-simplex and ∞ 251 facets)

Elements

See also 
 k21 polytope family
 1k2 polytope family

References 
 Alicia Boole Stott Geometrical deduction of semiregular from regular polytopes and space fillings, Verhandelingen of the Koninklijke academy van Wetenschappen width unit Amsterdam, Eerste Sectie 11,1, Amsterdam, 1910
 Stott, A. B. "Geometrical Deduction of Semiregular from Regular Polytopes and Space Fillings." Verhandelingen der Koninklijke Akad. Wetenschappen Amsterdam 11, 3-24, 1910.
 Alicia Boole Stott, "Geometrical deduction of semiregular from regular polytopes and space fillings," Verhandelingen der Koninklijke Akademie van Wetenschappen te Amsterdam, (eerste sectie), Vol. 11, No. 1, pp. 1–24 plus 3 plates, 1910.
 Stott, A. B. 1910. "Geometrical Deduction of Semiregular from Regular Polytopes and Space Fillings." Verhandelingen der Koninklijke Akad. Wetenschappen Amsterdam
 Schoute, P. H., Analytical treatment of the polytopes regularly derived from the regular polytopes, Ver. der Koninklijke Akad. van Wetenschappen te Amsterdam (eerstie sectie), vol 11.5, 1913.
 H. S. M. Coxeter: Regular and Semi-Regular Polytopes, Part I, Mathematische Zeitschrift, Springer, Berlin, 1940
 N.W. Johnson: The Theory of Uniform Polytopes and Honeycombs, Ph.D. Dissertation, University of Toronto, 1966
 H.S.M. Coxeter: Regular and Semi-Regular Polytopes, Part II, Mathematische Zeitschrift, Springer, Berlin, 1985
 H.S.M. Coxeter: Regular and Semi-Regular Polytopes, Part III, Mathematische Zeitschrift, Springer, Berlin, 1988

External links 
 PolyGloss v0.05: Gosset figures (Gossetoctotope)

Polytopes